The Chester Mountains are a group of mountains just north of the mouth of Crevasse Valley Glacier and  north of Saunders Mountain in the Ford Ranges of Marie Byrd Land. They were mapped by the Byrd Antarctic Expedition (1933–35) and named for Colby M. Chester, president of General Foods Corporation, who gave generous support to the Byrd expeditions.

References

Ford Ranges